ORV Sagar Kanya is a research vessel owned and operated by India's National Centre for Polar and Ocean Research (NCPOR). The ship has helped in India's studies of the Arabian Sea, the Bay of Bengal, and the Indian Ocean.

The multidisciplinary research vessel was built in Germany in 1983 and delivered in India to the Ministry of Earth Sciences (then Department of Ocean Development). The vessel is an ocean-observing platform equipped with scientific equipment and related facilities. 

The vessel was built to the class requirements of Lloyd's Register of Shipping and Indian Register of Shipping. The vessel is fully automatic diesel-electric and equipped with dynamic positioning. In addition to the twin-screw propulsion, two fin rudders and one bow thruster give the vessel enhanced manoeuvring ability.

References 

Specifications
NCAOR Page

1982 ships
Research vessels of India